Thomas Joseph Flynn (born 2 November 1930) is a retired major general in the United States Army. His assignments included Deputy Commander Army Intelligence and Security Command as well as Assistant Deputy Director for Operations/Deputy Chief of Central Security Service for the National Security Agency. Flynn enlisted in the Army in October 1952 after graduating from the University of Toronto with a B.A. degree in biology. He was commissioned in 1954 from Infantry Officer Candidate School. Flynn is also a graduate of the Army Command and General Staff College and the Air War College.

References

1930 births
Living people
People from Corning, New York
University of Toronto alumni
United States Army soldiers
United States Army Command and General Staff College alumni
United States Army personnel of the Vietnam War
Air War College alumni
Recipients of the Legion of Merit
United States Army generals
Military personnel from New York (state)